Doak Snead (December 24, 1949–September 16, 2020) was an American singer and songwriter. Born in Bronte, Texas, he lived in Nashville, Tennessee until his death. In 1968 he was in a duo with Gosney Thornton called Tom and Billy.
The Doak Snead Band appeared on the Austin music scene in 1973 as part of the Progressive Country Music movement. Snead has appeared in concert around the U.S. most notably the Kerrville Folk Festival and in a concert with the Houston Pops Orchestra in 1975.

Discography
Think of Me Sometime (1977). Produced by Huey P. Meaux and Danny Epps.  Crazy Cajun Records #1096.
Powderhorn (1978) Produced by Doak Snead and Lloyd Maines.  Hearsay Records #001.
1015 Main: The Bastrop Demos (1988) Produced by Gary Schiff and Doak Snead.
Inside (2001)  Produced by Richard Barrow and Doak Snead.  Sonic Lab Records.
They Call Me Mister (2001) Produced by Daylon Wear and Doak Snead
Joy and Peace for the Children compilation (2002) Produced by the American Music Therapists Association.
After 33 years, After 33 rpm Doak Snead Band. (2008) Produced by Doak and Kelley Snead. Hearsay Records.
 "Kids Rule!" (2010) (recorded under stage name Mister Doak) Produced by Drew Ramsey and Doak Snead. CuttyStang Records.
 “And They Call Me Mister Doak!” (2012) Produced by Daylon Wear and Doak Snead. Beans in the Cupboard Studio/TuneCore.
 "Catalogue" (2017)  Produced by Kelley Sallee Snead and Doak Snead.  Hearsay Records.
 "A Welcome Affair" (2018)  Produced by Bob Clement and Cameron Davidson. Mastermind Recordings, Nashville.

Other
Snead worked as a staff writer for Reba McEntire's publishing company and his songs have been recorded by Lari White and Avalon.  The Fontaines recorded his song "Let's Hitch a Ride on Santa's Sleigh" in 2007. and Americana artist Lainie Marsh recorded Doak's "Midnight Misty Juniper" on her album, The Hills Shall Cradle Thee in 2009. In 2015, along with new age musician Tony Gerber, he produced and wrote songs for "Roses & Tumbleweeds", an album released by independent artist Kelley Sallee Snead.

References

^Townshend Miller. September 7, 1974. Billboard Magazine, Vol. 86 . "Austin Bids As Nashville II". p. T-15. Retrieved September 26, 2010.
^Deborah Evans Price. June 29, 1996. Billboard Magazine. "A Starstruck Petty Returns to Working With Writers." p. 36. Retrieved September 26, 2010.
^Country Music Foundation Press. Copyright 2018 All Rights Reserved. "Outlaws & Armadillos, Country's Roaring '70s" exhibit book. Doak Snead Band/Greezy Wheels concert poster by Sam Yeates. p. 28; Doak Snead Band/New Riders of the Purple Sage concert poster by Guy Juke. p. 62. Retrieved February 25, 2019. 

1949 births
2020 deaths
Songwriters from Texas
Musicians from Nashville, Tennessee
People from Coke County, Texas